Jan van Boendale (c.1280 – c.1351), formerly sometimes known as Jan De Klerk ("Jan the Clerk") was a 14th-century secretary of the city of Antwerp and author of narrative and didactic verse. Two of his works, Brabantsche yeesten and Der leken spieghel, are listed in the Canon of Dutch Literature compiled by the Digital Library for Dutch Literature.

Life
Jan was born in Boendale, near Tervuren, around 1280. He moved to Antwerp, where he became secretary to the city council, and lived there until his death around 1351. He undertook a number of diplomatic missions on behalf of the city of Antwerp or of the States of Brabant, and in 1332 was present in the entourage of John III, Duke of Brabant, at Heylissem.

Works
Brabantsche yeesten (a history of the duchy of Brabant)
Der leken spieghel (a history of salvation)
Jans Testeye (a dialogue on controverted questions in philosophy and law)
Van den derden Eduwaert (an account of Edward III of England's arrival in the Low Countries and his Tournaisis campaign of 1340)
Die dietsche doctrinale (a didactic poem in three books)

References

Burgundian Netherlands poets
13th-century births
14th-century deaths
Flemish poets